Liolaemus hellmichi, commonly known as Hellmich's tree iguana, is a species of lizard in the family Iguanidae. This species is endemic to the Chilean matorral ecoregion within the nation of Chile.

Etymology
The specific name, hellmichi, is in honor of German herpetologist Walter Hellmich.

References

Further reading
Donoso Barros R (1975). "Nuevos reptiles y anfibios de Chile ". Boletin de la Sociedad de Biología de Concepción 48: 217–229. (Liolaemus hellmichi, new species, pp. 224–225). (in Spanish).

hellmichi
Lizards of South America
Endemic fauna of Chile
Reptiles of Chile
Chilean Matorral
Reptiles described in 1975
Taxa named by Roberto Donoso-Barros
Taxonomy articles created by Polbot